Psychrobacter is a genus of Gram-negative, osmotolerant, oxidase-positive, psychrophilic or psychrotolerant, aerobic bacteria which belong to the family  Moraxellaceae and the class Gammaproteobacteria. The shape is typically cocci or coccobacilli. Some of those bacteria were isolated from humans and can cause humans infections such as endocarditis and peritonitis. This genus of bacteria is able to grow at temperatures between −10 and 42 °C. Rudi Rossau found through DNA-rRNA hybridization analysis that Psychrobacter belongs to the Moraxellaceae. The first species (Psychrobacter immobilis) was described by Juni and Heym. Psychrobacter occur in wide range of moist, cold saline habitats, but they also occur in warm and slightly saline habitats.

Hypoacylated lipopolysaccharide (LPS) isolated from Psychrobacter cryohalolentis and Psychrobacter arcticus induces moderate TLR4-mediated inflammatory response in macrophages and such LPS bioactivity may potentially result in the failure of local and systemic bacterial clearance in patients.

Species include:

References

Further reading
 
 
 
 
 

Moraxellaceae
Bacteria genera
Psychrophiles